The Pawtucket River Bridge is a twin span, six-lane highway bridge that carries Interstate 95 (I-95) over the Seekonk River in Pawtucket, Rhode Island. The original bridge was built in 1958 and rehabilitated in 1996. The bridge was demolished in 2012-13 and replaced with a new deck arch bridge that was completed in summer 2013. In November 2016, the bridge was officially renamed the James E. Doyle Pawtucket River Bridge in memory of the former mayor of Pawtucket, who died two months earlier.

Deterioration
Truck drivers violating this restriction faced fines of $3,000 per violation. State police vehicles were posted on both sides of the bridge to enforce the restriction. Truckers were required to seek alternate routes, often exiting and passing through residential neighborhoods in Pawtucket and Central Falls, Rhode Island. Residents of these cities complained about the traffic, noise, and road deterioration that these trucks are causing.

Truckers continued to cross the bridge in spite of the fines. From November 2007 through February 2009, state police issued more than 5,600 violation notices and more than $3 million in fines. In 2011 it was reported that the state government of Rhode Island had collected around $7 million in fines. The state has not shared the revenues with the cities of Pawtucket and Central Falls, which bear the brunt of the detours that the truckers must take. With the opening of the new South 95 bridge on 9/15/2012, the axle restriction has ceased.

Replacement
In 2010, construction began on a new replacement bridge that was built in three phases, beginning with a new span to the south of the old one, which opened to northbound traffic in early 2012. The original northbound span was then demolished and rebuilt. In September 2012, the new middle span opened to temporary southbound traffic, ending all weight restrictions on the Pawtucket River Bridge. The original southbound span was then demolished and rebuilt. The new $82 million bridge was completed in summer 2013 and all traffic shifted to their permanent lanes.

See also

References

Bridges in Providence County, Rhode Island
Bridges on the Interstate Highway System
Road bridges in Rhode Island
Interstate 95
Bridges completed in 1958
1958 establishments in Rhode Island
Arch bridges in the United States